Lythrurus, the finescale shiners, is a genus of cyprinid fish found in North America.  There are currently 11 species in this genus.

Species 
 Lythrurus alegnotus (Snelson, 1972) (warrior shiner)
 Lythrurus ardens (Cope, 1868) (rosefin shiner)
 Lythrurus atrapiculus (Snelson, 1972) (blacktip shiner)
 Lythrurus bellus (O. P. Hay, 1881) (pretty shiner)
 Lythrurus fasciolaris (C. H. Gilbert, 1891) (scarletfin shiner, scarlet shiner)
 Lythrurus fumeus (Evermann, 1892) (ribbon shiner)
 Lythrurus lirus (D. S. Jordan, 1877) (mountain shiner)
 Lythrurus matutinus (Cope, 1870) (pinewoods shiner)
 Lythrurus roseipinnis (O. P. Hay, 1885) (cherryfin shiner)
 Lythrurus snelsoni (H. W. Robison, 1985) (Ouachita shiner)
 Lythrurus umbratilis (Girard, 1856) (redfin shiner)

References 
 

 
Taxa named by David Starr Jordan 
Taxonomy articles created by Polbot